"Death" is the second single by English indie rock band White Lies, released by Fiction Records. "Death" was initially released on CD and 7-inch vinyl on 22 September 2008, prior to the release of their debut album, To Lose My Life... The track was then re-released on 22 June 2009 on multiple formats as the band's fifth and final single from the album. In the United States, the track was released as part of a four-track extended play titled Death, alongside all United Kingdom-released B-sides.

"Death" was the second track written by White Lies, after "Unfinished Business". The 2008 release of "Death" contained one B-side, "Black Song", while the 7" vinyl was accompanied by various remixes by Crystal Castles and Haunts. The single reached No. 52 on the UK Singles Chart. The 2009 re-release included further remixes by Chase & Status, Mistabishi, L'amour La Morgue and M83.

Music video
The music video for the 2008 release was filmed in Sweden by director Andreas Nilsson. A second Nilsson-directed video was released in promotion of the single's 2009 reissue, for the Crystal Castles remix of the song.

Use in media
"Death" was used in the 2009 film Jennifer's Body and in the 2014 Ana Lily Amirpour indie vampire film A Girl Walks Home Alone at Night. The song was also used in the official trailer for season 3 of the hit Netflix series, Sex Education.

Track listings

2008 release
CD
 "Death" – 5:01
 "Death (Crystal Castles Remix)" – 4:46

7" vinyl (1)
 "Death" – 5:01
 "Black Song" – 3:47

7" vinyl (2)
 "Death" – 5:01
 "Death (Haunts Remix)" – 5:53

US CD EP
 "Death" – 5:01
 "Black Song" – 3:47
 "Death (Crystal Castles Remix)" – 4:46
 "Death (Haunts Remix)" – 5:53

2009 release
7" vinyl (1)
 "Death" – 5:01
 "Nothing to Give (M83 Remix)" – 6:24

7" vinyl (2)
 "Death (Crystal Castles Remix)" – 4:46
 "Death (Mistabishi Remix)" – 4:48

UK iTunes EP
 "Death (Chase & Status Remix)" – 4:55
 "Death (Mistabishi Remix)" – 4:48
 "Death (L'amour la Morgue Edition)" – 4:39
 "Nothing to Give (M83 Remix)" – 6:24

References

External links

2008 singles
White Lies (band) songs
Song recordings produced by Ed Buller
2008 songs
Fiction Records singles